On 23 November 1979, Paul McCartney's band Wings began a 19-date concert tour of the United Kingdom to promote their recent album, Back to the Egg.

History
Wings' lineup for the tour was Paul and Linda McCartney, Denny Laine, Laurence Juber and Steve Holley, together with a brass section from the previous tour led by Howie Casey.

Following the main part of the tour, Wings teamed up with an all-star cast of musicians and took the name Rockestra to perform a series of Concerts for the People of Kampuchea at the Hammersmith Odeon in London.

It was originally to have been the first leg of a planned world tour, with further stops scheduled in Japan, Europe and America. However, it became Wings' final concert tour, after McCartney's marijuana arrest in Tokyo the following January.

Releases
A recording of "Coming Up" from Glasgow on 17 December 1979 of the tour was released on the single in April 1980 taking the A-side in the United States and becoming a number one hit. The Glasgow show itself was widely bootlegged under the title 'Last Flight'.

Six songs of the Hammersmith Odeon performance, three by Wings and three by Rockestra, were released on a Concerts for the People of Kampuchea live album.

With the beginning of Paul McCartney Archive Collection album reissues in 2010 more songs from a Glasgow show have been released. Band on the Run reissue received "No Words" and "Band on the Run" as pre-order bonus tracks, McCartney included "Every Night", "Maybe I'm Amazed" and "Hot as Sun" and McCartney II included "Coming Up" as bonus tracks.

Tour dates
After a live rehearsal at the Liverpool Royal Court attended by pupils of Liverpool Institute, McCartney's alma mater and of John Lennon's former school, Quarry Bank.

Festivals and other miscellaneous performances
This concert was a part of "Concerts for the People of Kampuchea"

Tour set list

External links
"Wings Last Tour"

References

1979 concert tours
Wings (band) concert tours
1979 in British music
Concert tours of the United Kingdom